The Dniprovskyi District is an urban district of the city of Kyiv, the capital of Ukraine. It is named after the Dnipro River and is located on its left-bank.

Geography

History
On 23 May 1969, the Dniprovskyi District was established out of a portion of the city's Darnytskyi District based on a decree of the Presidium of the Verkhovna Rada of the Ukrainian Soviet Socialist Republic.

See also
 Subdivisions of Kyiv

References

External links
 

Urban districts of Kyiv
States and territories established in 1969
1969 establishments in Ukraine